Helen Fraser may refer to:

 Helen Fraser (actress) (born 1942), English actress
 Helen Fraser (executive) (born 1949), British executive and businesswoman 
 Helen Fraser (feminist) later Moyes (1881–1979), Scottish suffragist, feminist, educationalist, politician, emigrated to Australia, toured America to develop WWI Women's Land Army